Suppression of tumorigenicity 8 (ovarian) is a protein that in humans is encoded by the ST8 gene. This gene is located on a 300-kb segment of chromosome 6q25-27, which facilitates further efforts to identify a gene associated with ovarian cancer. The official symbol (ST8) and official name "Suppression of Tumorigenicity 8" are maintained by the HGNC. It is also known as Oncogene OVC (ovarian adenocarcinoma oncogene).

The inactivation of the tumor suppressor gene in ST8 may be crucial for the development of cancer; the homologous regions in humans is the short arm of chromosome 6 for deletions in sporadic ovarian adenocarcinomas. In 91 informative sporadic tumors, 34 lost their heterozygosity, including some benign, low-malignancy potential, and early stage tumors, suggesting that it is an early event in the development of ovarian adenocarcinoma. In different portions of chromosome 6q, there were deletions and translocations which were subsequently reported by cytogenic analyses of primary ovarian carcinomas and ovarian cancer cell lines.

Patients with advanced disease who achieved a complete remission documented by peritoneoscopy or laparotomy (or both) have a median survival time exceeding three years. People with ovarian adenocarcinoma were treated with a four-drug combination- hexamethylmelamine, cyclophosphamide, methotrexate, and 5-fluorouracil — with the oral alkylating agent melphalan. The four-drug combination helped in the increased overall remission rate, but was more toxigenic than melphalan. The four-drug regimen is more effective than melphalan in the management of advanced ovarian adenocarcinoma.

References 

ST8 suppression of tumorigenicity 8 (ovarian) [ Homo sapiens (human)
Am J Hum Genet. 1994 Jul;55(1):143-9
Buick et al., 1985; Deger et al., 1997; Sheer et al., 1987; Tibiletti et al., 1996; Trent and Salmon, 1981;Whang-Peng et al., 1984
N Engl J Med 299:1261–1266, 1978

https://www.ncbi.nlm.nih.gov/gene/6765

Further reading 

Human proteins